Princess Adelheid of Hohenlohe-Langenburg	(20 July 1835 – 25 January 1900) was Duchess of Schleswig-Holstein, a niece of Queen Victoria of the United Kingdom, first cousin of King Edward VII, and the mother-in-law of Emperor Wilhelm II of Germany. She is the most recent common matrilineal ancestress (directly through women only) of Carl XVI Gustaf of Sweden and Felipe VI of Spain.

Early life
Adelheid was born the second daughter of Ernst I, Prince of Hohenlohe-Langenburg by his wife Princess Feodora of Leiningen, who was the older, maternal half-sister of the British Queen Victoria.

Napoleon III's proposal of marriage
In 1852, not long after Napoléon III  became Emperor of France, he made a proposal of marriage to Adelheid's parents after he had been rebuffed by Princess Carola of Sweden. Although he had never met her, the political advantages of the marriage for the Emperor were obvious. It would provide dynastic respectability for the Bonaparte line, and could promote a closer alliance between France and Britain, because Adelheid was Queen Victoria's niece. At the same time, she was not officially a member of the British royal family, so the risk of refusal was small. Adelheid could be expected to be grateful enough for her good fortune to convert to Roman Catholicism.

As it turned out, the proposal horrified Queen Victoria and Prince Albert, who preferred not to confer such hasty legitimacy upon France's latest "revolutionary" regime — the durability of which was deemed dubious — nor to yield up a young kinswoman for the purpose. The British court maintained a strict silence toward the Hohenlohes during the marriage negotiations, lest the Queen seem either eager for or repulsed by the prospect of Napoléon as a nephew-in-law.

The parents, accurately interpreting the British silence as disapproval, declined the French offer—to their sixteen-year-old daughter's dismay. This may have been only a maneuver by the Hohenlohe family to obtain concessions from the French to secure their daughter's future interests. But before his ministers could press his case with further inducements, Napoléon gave up pursuit of a royal consort. Instead he offered marriage to Eugénie de Montijo, Countess of Teba, whom he had been simultaneously soliciting to become his mistress, and who had refused his advances.

Marriage and children

On September 11, 1856 Adelheid married Frederick VIII, Duke of Schleswig-Holstein.  They were parents to seven children:

Prince Friedrich of Schleswig-Holstein-Sonderburg-Augustenburg (3 August 1857 – 29 October 1858) he died at the age of fourteen months. 
Princess Augusta Viktoria of Schleswig-Holstein-Sonderburg-Augustenburg (22 October 1858 – 11 April 1921) she married Wilhelm II of Germany on 27 February 1881. They had seven children.
Princess Karoline Mathilde of Schleswig-Holstein-Sonderburg-Augustenburg (25 January 1860 – 20 February 1932) she married Friedrich Ferdinand, Duke of Schleswig-Holstein on 19 March 1885. They had six children. 
Prince Gerhard of Schleswig-Holstein-Sonderburg-Augustenburg (20 January 1862 – 11 April 1862) he died at the age of two months. 
Ernst Günther II, Duke of Schleswig-Holstein (11 August 1863 – 21 February 1921) he married Princess Dorothea of Saxe-Coburg and Gotha on 2 August 1898.
Princess Louise Sophie of Schleswig-Holstein-Sonderburg-Augustenburg (8 April 1866 – 28 April 1952) she married Prince Friedrich Leopold of Prussia on 24 June 1889. They had four children. 
Princess Feodora Adelheid of Schleswig-Holstein-Sonderburg-Augustenburg (3 July 1874 – 21 June 1910).

Later life
With her husband, the Duchess first resided at Dolzig, in Lower Lusatia, but in 1863 moved to Kiel when Duke Frederick became legitimate heir to the duchies of Schleswig-Holstein. They returned to Dolzig only three years later, when after the Austrian-Prussian War the duchies were annexed by Prussia. In the following years the couple alternated between Dolzig, Gotha, and the family domains at Primkenau. Duke Frederick died in 1880, shortly before the couple's eldest daughter was engaged to the Prussian heir. After the marriage in February 1881, Duchess Adelheid settled in Dresden, where she lived a retired life, interesting herself chiefly in painting and music.

The Duchess died at Dresden on 25 January 1900.

A small island in Franz Josef Land, Adelaide Island (Остров Аделаиды), was named after Princess Adelheid by the Austro-Hungarian North Pole Expedition.

Ancestry

References

External links 

1835 births
1900 deaths
House of Augustenburg
House of Hohenlohe-Langenburg
Princesses of Schleswig-Holstein-Sonderburg-Augustenburg
Princesses of Hohenlohe-Langenburg
People from Langenburg